Fyodor Vasilievich Polischuk (born July 4, 1979) is a Kazakhstani professional ice hockey left winger currently playing for Metallurg Novokuznetsk of the Kontinental Hockey League.

Polischuk previously played for Torpedo Ust-Kamenogorsk in the Vysshaya Liga between 1998 and 2004 before moving to the Russian Superleague with Metallurg Novokuznetsk. After one season he moved to SKA Saint Petersburg before returning to Metallurg Novokuznetsk during the 2006–07 season. He remained until 2010 when he joined Barys Astana.

He is a member of the Kazakhstan national team and participated in the 2006 Winter Olympics in Turin.

Early life
Polischuk was born in the village of Kolodyste, located in Cherkassy Oblast, Ukraine.

Career statistics

Regular season and playoffs

International

References

External links
 
 
 
 

1979 births
Living people
People from Cherkasy Oblast
Barys Nur-Sultan players
Expatriate ice hockey players in Russia
Metallurg Novokuznetsk players
Ice hockey players at the 2006 Winter Olympics
Kazakhstani ice hockey centres
Ukrainian emigrants to Kazakhstan
Kazzinc-Torpedo players
Olympic ice hockey players of Kazakhstan
SKA Saint Petersburg players
Asian Games gold medalists for Kazakhstan
Asian Games silver medalists for Kazakhstan
Medalists at the 2003 Asian Winter Games
Medalists at the 2011 Asian Winter Games
Ice hockey players at the 2003 Asian Winter Games
Ice hockey players at the 2011 Asian Winter Games
Asian Games medalists in ice hockey